B. Rajeevan is a Malayalam author and literary critic from Kerala, India.

Biography
He was born in 1946 in Kayamkulam near Quilon, Kerala. He studied at SN College, Quilon and University College, Trivandrum. He has been teaching Malayalam literature in government colleges since 1971. During the Emergency in 1975, he was branded as a Naxalite sympathiser and had to face police harassment and house arrest. In the eighties, he served on the State Committee of the Janakeeya Samskarika Vedi (People's Cultural Forum) and participated in various struggles. He was arrested and was expelled from his long-time college post. Since 1969, he has written and published essays on philosophy, aesthetics, history, political thought, film and poetry. He has been living together with poet Savithri Rajeevan from 1975 onwards.

List of works
 Swathanthryathinte Samagratha (The Integrity of Freedom)
 Jaivarashtreeyavum Janasanjayavum (Biopolitics and Populism)
 Marxisavum Shasthravum (Marxism and Science)
 Anyavalkaranavum Yogavum (Alienation and Destiny)
 Jananibidamaya Danthagopuram
 Varthamanathinte Charithram (History of the Present)
 Vakkukalum Vasthukkalum (Words and Objects)
 EMSinte Swapnam (The Dream of EMS)

Awards
 Kerala Sahitya Akademi Award, 2011
 Chintha Ravindran Award, 2019
 Kerala Library Council Award, 2015
 M. N. Vijayan Award, 2014
 O. V. Vijayan Sahitya Puraskaram, 2013
 C. P. Menon Award, 2013
 Basheer Award, 2011
 Narendra Prasad Foundation Award, 2011
 Guru Darshana Award, 2011
 Shanthakumaran Thampi Foundation Award, 2011

References

21st-century Indian writers
Recipients of the Kerala Sahitya Akademi Award
Living people
1946 births
Malayalam literary critics
Indian literary critics